Maile S.L. Shimabukuro (born October 1, 1970) is a Democratic member of the Hawaii State Senate, representing the state's 21st district since her election in 2011. The district includes Kalaeloa, Honokai Hale, Ko ‘Olina, Nānākuli, Mā‘ili, Wai‘anae, Mākaha, Mākua on the island of Oahu. She is a graduate of Iolani School, Colorado College and the William S. Richardson School of Law at University of Hawaiʻi at Mānoa.

Committees
State Senator, District 21 Leeward Coast (01/2011–present)

Chair, Hawaiian Affairs Committee
Member, Ways & Means
Member, Transportation & Energy
Member, International Affairs & the Arts
Member, Women's and Hawaiian Caucuses
(Past) Vice Chair, Judiciary & Labor Committee
(Past) Member, Water & Land Committee
State House Representative, District 45 Waianae/Makaha/Makua (01/2003-12/2010)
Chair, Human Services & Housing Committee (2005-2006)
Vice Chair, Hawaiian Affairs Committee (2009-2010)

Auto Accident February 2003
In February 2003, Shimabukuro was involved in a car accident while driving toward Honolulu from Waianae. Her vehicle flipped over and landed in the Waianae-bound traffic lane. Shimabukuro was unharmed and credits her safety to the fact that she was wearing a seat belt at the time of the incident.

References

External links

Hawaii State Legislature - Senator Maile Shimabukuro
Maile's District 21 Blog
Maile's FaceBook page
Project Vote Smart - Representative Maile S.L. Shimabukuro

1970 births
Living people
21st-century American politicians
21st-century American women politicians
Democratic Party Hawaii state senators
Democratic Party members of the Hawaii House of Representatives
Hawaii politicians of Japanese descent
Women state legislators in Hawaii
American women of Japanese descent in politics
Colorado College alumni
ʻIolani School alumni
William S. Richardson School of Law alumni
Hawaii people of Okinawan descent